The 2015 All Stars Match was the fifth annual representative exhibition match played between the Indigenous All Stars and the NRL All Stars. It was held on 13 February 2015, returning from a one-year hiatus.

The Indigenous side was selected through public voting which lasted from 1 December 2014 through to 9 January 2015. The NRL side wasn't voted on by the public, as in previous games, but selected by the team's coach, Wayne Bennett. Both sides were officially announced on 19 January.

Preceding games included a touch football game between an Indigenous and Australian sides which featured rugby league legend Scott Prince, won 5-4 by the Indigenous team, a QLD Under 16s Indigenous All Stars vs. NSW Under 16s Indigenous All Stars game, drawn 24-24 and the Women's All Stars exhibition match which was won by the NRL Women's All Stars 26-8.

Teams

1 - Chris Sandow was originally selected to play but withdrew due to injury. He was replaced by Tyrone Roberts.
2 - Will Hopoate was originally selected to play but withdrew due to injury. He was replaced by Joseph Paulo.
3 - Michael Ennis was originally selected to play but withdrew due to injury. He was replaced by Nathan Friend.
4 - Tom Learoyd-Lahrs was originally selected to play but withdrew due to injury. He was replaced by Chris Grevsmuhl.
5 - Greg Bird was originally selected to play but withdrew due to injury. Chris Grevsmuhl was promoted to the starting lineup as a result and Bird was replaced by David Fifita.
6 - Sam Thaiday was originally selected to play but withdrew due to injury. Kyle Turner was promoted to the starting lineup as a result and Thaiday was replaced by Tyson Andrews.

Result

Women's All Stars match

The NRL announced the Women's and Indigenous Women's All Stars teams to take the field as part of the Harvey Norman Rugby League All Stars match on Saturday 13 February in Brisbane.
This will be the fourth Women's rugby league match for the women as part of the fixture, with the level of competition stepping up again next year, thanks to increased women's pathways nationally and female participation levels across the game at an all-time high.

Women's Teams

The Women's All Stars exhibition match which was held as a curtain raiser for the men's 2015 All Stars match and was won by the NRL Women's All Stars 26-8.

References

All Stars Match
Rugby league on the Gold Coast, Queensland
NRL All Stars match